Auguste Étienne François Mayer (Brest, 1805 - Brest, 1890) was a French painter.

He was specialised in naval motives. He participated on several Arctic expeditions, thus reflected in his collection of artwork.

Mayer taught drawing at the École Navale.

External links 

 MAYER Auguste etienne françois
 AUGUSTE MAYER TRAFALGAR PAINTING. 

1805 births
1890 deaths
19th-century French painters
French male painters
French marine artists
19th-century French male artists